Aditi Munshi is an Indian Bengali singer and politician from West Bengal. Aditi Munshi was born in 1989. Munshi is known for singing many Hindu devotional songs in Bengali. She was also a participant of Zee Bangla's Sa Re Ga Ma Pa 2015. She won the Rajarhat Gopalpur assembly constituency seat in 2021 West Bengal assembly election as candidate of All India Trinamool Congress.

Personal life 
She was born to Manindra Munshi and Mitali Munshi. She is married to Debraj Chakraborty since 2018.

Career and Achievements 

Aditi Munshi completed her schooling from Kolkata. During high school days, she was already familiar with Rabindrasangit and Nazrulgeeti. She received a scholarship from Ravindra Bharti University to pursue a career in music.

She received a scholarship from the Government of West Bengal to pursue the "Padboli Kirtan" after graduation. Aditi Munshi received singing lessons from Mr. Snehasi Chatterjee and later Mr. Subrakanti Chatterjee. She learned Nazrulgeeti from Mr. Shankar Ghoshal and sought the expertise of Mrs.
Kanakona Mitra, Vidushi Saraswati Das and Mr. Timir Baran Ghosh for Kirtan and Old Bangla songs respectively. Later in 2015, she participated in Sa Re Ga Ma Pa, which is a popular singing reality show in West Bengal. 

Aditi Munshi also won various awards for her outstanding performance everywhere in India. She won the award of Mr. MK Narayan of West Bengal within the year 2010 and All India Merit Test Competition from National Scholar within the year 200?. She was fully employed as a music artiste at India Radio, Kolkata within the year 2012.

Aditi Munshi also sings many different Hindu devotional songs. Her covers of many different Hindu religious songs has made her famous. Her covers have millions of views across Facebook and YouTube.

References

External links 
 Official website
Aditi Munshi IMDb

West Bengal politicians
Bengali singers
Year of birth missing (living people)
Living people
Trinamool Congress politicians from West Bengal
Women in West Bengal politics
Singers from West Bengal
1989 births
Zee Bangla contestants